Deehan is a surname. Notable people with the surname include:

Geoff Deehan (born 1952), British film and television producer
John Deehan (born 1957), English footballer and manager